The knockout stage of the 2015 FIFA Women's World Cup began on 20 June and ended with the final match on 5 July 2015. A total of 16 teams competed in this knockout stage.

Format
The knockout stage comprises the 16 teams that advanced from the group stage of the tournament. There are four rounds of matches, with each round eliminating half of the teams entering that round. The successive rounds are the round of 16, quarter-finals, semi-finals, and the final. There is also a match to decide third and fourth place. For each game in the knockout stage, any draw at 90 minutes is followed by 30 minutes of extra time; if scores are still level, there is a penalty shootout to determine who progresses to the next round. Single yellow cards accrued will be cancelled after the quarter-finals, therefore ensuring that no players miss the Final because of receiving a caution in the semi-finals.

Combinations of matches in the round of 16
The third-placed teams which advanced will be placed with the winners of groups A, B, C and D according to a table published in Section 28 of the tournament regulations.

Qualified teams
The top two teams of each preliminary group and the four best-ranked third place teams advanced to the knockout stage.

Bracket

Round of 16

Germany vs Sweden

China PR vs Cameroon

Brazil vs Australia

France vs South Korea

Canada vs Switzerland

Norway vs England

United States vs Colombia

Japan vs Netherlands

Quarter-finals

Germany vs France

China PR vs United States

Australia vs Japan

England vs Canada

Semi-finals

United States vs Germany

Japan vs England

Third place play-off

Final

References

External links
Official website

knockout stage
2015